Wadaj Dam, is an earthfill and gravity dam on Meena river near Junnar, Pune district in the state of Maharashtra in India.

Specifications
The dam is located in the Ghod basin and is part of the Kukadi project, which constructed five dams in the region. Other dams included in this project are Yedgaon Dam, Manikdoh Dam, Dimbhe Dam and Pimpalgaon Joge Dam.

Purpose
 Irrigation

See also
 Dams in Maharashtra
 List of reservoirs and dams in India

References

Dams in Pune district
Dams completed in 1983
1983 establishments in Maharashtra
20th-century architecture in India